The pâte à bombe is a base used in pastry from pasteurized eggs to be used in cold preparations (tiramisu, mousse, semifreddo). It spread in Italy in 1978 thanks to Domenico Cuofano, pastry chef of the Swiss school.

References 

French desserts